Earnest may refer to:

People

Given name
Earnest Brown IV (born 1999), American football player
Earnest Byner (born 1962), American football player
Earnest Elmo Calkins (1868–1964), early advertising innovator
Earnest Sevier Cox (1880–1966), American Methodist preacher
Earnest Stewart Cox (1900–1992), British railway engineer and author
Earnest Frank, American football coach
Earnest Graham (born 1980), American football player
Earnest Gray (born 1957), American football player
Earnest Hooton (1887–1954), American physical anthropologist
Ernie Hudson (born 1945), American actor
Earnest Jackson (born 1959), American football player
Earnest Mudzengi, Zimbabwean politician
Earnest Pugh, American gospel singer-songwriter
Earnest Rhone (born 1953), former NFL linebacker
Earnest Ross (born 1991), American professional basketball player
Earnest James Ujaama (born 1965), American Muslim social activist 
Earnest Wilson, American football coach

Surname
Conrad Earnest (born 1957), American soccer goalkeeper
G. Brooks Earnest (1902–1992), American educator
James Earnest (1818–1900), Wisconsin state legislator
Josh Earnest (born 1975), former White House press secretary
Les Earnest (born 1930), American computer scientist
Matthew Earnest (born 1969), American theater director

Other
Earnest (company), an American student loan provider
Earnest, Kansas, a ghost town
Earnest Bridge, a bridge near Marcola, Oregon
Earnest class destroyer, a destroyer class of the British Royal Navy
HMS Earnest (1896), a destroyer in the class

See also
Earnestville (disambiguation)

Ernest (disambiguation)